John Curlett (March 15, 1870 – February 3, 1944) was an American politician who served in the Virginia House of Delegates. His father, T. Spicer Curlett, also served in the House.

References

External links 

1870 births
1944 deaths
Democratic Party members of the Virginia House of Delegates
20th-century American politicians